Helge Eide (born 1 April 1954) is a Norwegian businessman.

He graduated from Rogaland University College (now named University of Stavanger) with a bachelor's degree in petroleum engineering.

He became managing director in DNO ASA in 2000, having first joined that company in 1996. He previously held management positions in Smedvig Group, Norsk Hydro, Read Petroleum Energy and Elf.

References

External links 
DNO

1954 births
Living people
Norwegian businesspeople
People in the petroleum industry
University of Stavanger alumni